The German Federal Coast Guard is a civilian law enforcement organisation whose primary missions are border protection, maritime environmental protection, shipping safety, fishery protection and customs enforcement. The Küstenwache is an association of several federal agencies, not a single entity like the United States Coast Guard.

The agencies that make up the Küstenwache have a common plan of action and direct their operations from two Coast Guard Centers (German: Küstenwachzentren), Neustadt (Holstein) for the Baltic Sea and Cuxhaven for the North Sea.

Structure and responsibilities

Units and personnel from these federal agencies make up the coast guard:

 Bundespolizei (Federal Police), Ministry of the Interior
 Waterways and Shipping Offices, Federal Waterways and Shipping Administration (WSV), Federal Ministry for Transport, Construction and Urban Development
 Kontrolleinheit See (Maritime Customs Service), Federal Customs Administration, Federal Ministry of Finance
 Federal Agency for Agriculture and Nutrition (BLE), Federal Ministry of Consumer Protection, Food, and Agriculture

Coast guard personnel
The personnel serving with the Küstenwache include both police officers (in the case of the Bundespolizei and Wasserzoll) and civilians from the Waterways and Shipping Office and other agencies. Küstenwache personnel do not have combatant status as it is not a military unit as many other coast guards are. In contrast, the United States Coast Guard is both a military service and a law enforcement organisation and its commissioned officers have both police and military powers. However, police officers serving with the Küstenwache retain their usual police powers, adjusted to the maritime nature of their job.

Ships and other vessels

A total of 27 ships and boats from the aforementioned institutions are in operation (Bundespolizei: six ships; Wasserzoll: eight customs cutters, four customs cruisers; WSV: three multi-purpose ships; BLE: two fishery protection boats, three fishery research ships).

The ships are all marked with the legend "Küstenwache" as well as a black-red-gold signet on the hull and the coast guard's coat-of-arms. However, the hull colour differs from agency to agency: blue for the Bundespolizei, green for the Zoll and black for the WSV and BLE.

A number of helicopters and planes are in use as well.

Some Ships:
BP 24	Bad Bramstedt	
BP 25	Bayreuth	
BP 26	Eschwege	
BP 81	Potsdam	
BP 82	Bamberg	
BP 83	Bad Düben		
MS Priwall
MS Kalkgrund
FSB Seeadler
 Hamburg
SUBS Mellum

Ranks

See also 
 Law enforcement in Germany
 German Navy
 German Maritime Search and Rescue Service

External links
 Link for the Coast guard arm of the German Federal Police, In German

Coast guards
Sea rescue organizations
Federal law enforcement agencies of Germany